Rahovë (in Albanian) or Orahovo  (in Serbian: Орахово) is a village in the municipality of Mitrovica in the District of Mitrovica, Kosovo. According to the 2011 census, it has 396 inhabitants.

Demography 
In 2018 census, the village had in total 450 inhabitants, from whom 450	(100%) were Albanians.

Notes

References 

Villages in Mitrovica, Kosovo